Currently there are three translations of the Bible into modern Kyrgyz.

Ray of Hope (Боорукерликтин өкүлдүгү «ҮМҮТ НУРУ») produced a translation from the Russian Synodal Version. This is the most commonly used translation.

Lingua Service («Лингвосервис» борбору) together with the United Bible Society (Бириккен Ыйык Китеп Коомдору) published a new translation of the New Testament in 2005. They are currently working on the Old Testament.

Askar Mambetaliev has translated a large portion of the Bible into a more dynamic equivalent/paraphrase translation. This translation is specially intended for evangelism.

Jehovah's Witnesses have revised the Ray of Hope translation to match closer to the English New World Translation producing a Kyrgyz "New World Translation", Жаңы дүйнө котормосу.

References

External links
https://amanjol.com/kg : Ray of Hope and Lingua Service translations
https://qendeh.net ROH & LS translations in the modified Arabic script (used in Xinjiang)

Kyrgyz
Kyrgyz-language literature
Kyrgyz language
Christianity in Kyrgyzstan